Changezi, also spelled Changizi is a Turkic-origin surname in Iran, Afghanistan, Pakistan and India. This surname is taken from the name of Changez khan (Genghis Khan) and/or his military that came to the Middle East and South Asia. It is common among Moghol, Mughal, Hazara, Aimaq, and some Turkic peoples within Central and South Asia and the Persian - Middle East in particular.

Notable people with this name 
 Yagana Changezi (1884–1956), Indian Urdu poet.
 Younus Changezi (born 1944), Pakistani Politician and Footballer.
 Naseem Mirza Changezi, Indian freedom fighter who is now 106 years old, had met revolutionary Indian freedom fighter Bhagat Singh in 1929 and fought against the British empire for Indian independence.
 Wajahat Mirza Changezi, was an Indian screenwriter and film director who penned the dialogues of some of the most successful films in India during the 1950s and 1960s, best known for Mughal-e-Azam (1960) and the Academy Award-nominee, Mother India (1957).
 Mohsin Changezi, Pakistani Urdu poet.
 Samad Ali Changezi was a Flight Lieutenant of Pakistan. 
 Sharbat Ali Changezi, Air Marshal (Retired) of Pakistan Air Force
 Jan Ali Changezi former Minister for Education in the Balochistan provincial government belonging to Pakistan Peoples Party.

See also 
 Mirza
 Barlas
 Khan

References 

Mughal clans of Pakistan
Pashto-language surnames
Pakistani names
Urdu masculine given names
Urdu-language surnames
Indian people of Mongolian descent
Indian people of Turkic descent
Indian surnames
Patronymic surnames
Mongolian-language surnames
Surnames of Indian origin